"Yes, Mr. Peters" is a song written by Steve Karliski and Larry Kolber, and recorded by American country music artists Roy Drusky and Priscilla Mitchell as a duet. It was released in May 1965 as the lead single from the album, Love's Eternal Triangle. The single was Drusky's only number one hit, spending two weeks atop the Hot Country Songs charts. It was also the only Top 40 entry for Mitchell, and one of three duets that she recorded with Drusky.

Content
The song discusses a love triangle, with a married businessman (Drusky in the hit version) taking a phone call from his girlfriend (Mitchell). As only the listener is able to hear the girlfriend's side of the conversation—for instance, asking when she can expect to meet her boyfriend—and that presumably others cannot hear her end of the conversation, the businessman is able to disguise the conversation through responses that lead others to believe he is headed to the office for a meeting with "Mr. Peters."

Reception
In 1965, Lorene Mann and Justin Tubb recorded an answer song titled "Hurry, Mr. Peters", for their duets album Together and Alone. This song peaked at number 23 on the country charts.

Chart performance

References

Songs about fictional male characters
1965 singles
Male–female vocal duets
Roy Drusky songs
Priscilla Mitchell songs
1965 songs
Song recordings produced by Jerry Kennedy
Mercury Records singles
Songs about telephone calls
Songs about infidelity